Packwood is a surname. Notable people with the surname include:

Allen George Packwood, Director of the Churchill Archives Centre
Bob Packwood (born 1932), former United States senator from Oregon
Gene Packwood, artist and political cartoonist
Kelly Packwood, Welsh international lawn & indoor bowler
Kerry Packwood, Welsh international lawn & indoor bowler
Joshua Packwood, first white valedictorian of Morehouse College
Will Packwood (born 1993), American soccer player
William Packwood (1832–1917), American politician

fr:Packwood